Huntleya fasciata is a species of orchid that occurs from Colombia and northwestern Ecuador to Honduras and Belize.

References

External links 

fasciata
Orchids of Belize
Orchids of Colombia
Orchids of Ecuador
Orchids of Honduras